Stenorrhipis is a genus of liverwort in family Cephaloziellaceae. It contains the following species (but this list may be incomplete):
 Stenorrhipis rhizomatica, Herzog

The taxonomic placement of this genus is uncertain; it has been previously placed in the Lophoziaceae by Schuster or in the Jungermanniaceae.

Jungermanniales
Taxonomy articles created by Polbot
Jungermanniales genera